Isadore Goldsmith (26 May 1893 - 8 October 1964) was an Austrian film producer. During the 1930s and 1940s he worked in the British film industry after fleeing from Berlin following the Nazi rise to power. He was married to the novelist Vera Caspary.

Selected filmography
 Whom the Gods Love (1936)
 Southern Roses (1936)
 Under Secret Orders (1937)
 The Lilac Domino (1937)
 I Killed the Count (1939)
 The Stars Look Down (1940)
 Hatter's Castle (1942)
 The Voice Within (1946)
 Bedelia (1946)
 Three Husbands (1951)

References

Bibliography
 Brinson, Charmian, Dove, Richard & Taylor, Jennifer. Immortal Austria?: Austrians in Exile in Britain. Rodopi, 2007.

External links
 

1893 births
1964 deaths
Austrian film producers
Austrian male screenwriters
Film people from Vienna
Austrian Jews
Jewish emigrants from Nazi Germany to the United Kingdom
20th-century Austrian screenwriters
20th-century Austrian male writers